Industrial food can refer to:
Convenience food, also known as (tertiary) processed food - food that is commercially prepared (often through processing) to optimise ease of consumption
Food industry - a diverse collection of businesses that supply most of the food consumed by the world's population
Intensive farming or industrial agriculture - various types of, often highly mechanised, agriculture with higher levels of input and output than traditional methods
Factory farming, also known as intensive animal farming and industrial livestock production - a production approach towards farm animals in order to maximize production output, while minimizing production costs. 
Intensive crop farming - the industrialized production of crops

See also
Agribusiness
Mechanised agriculture